In the United States, a postal holiday is a federal holiday recognized by the United States Postal Service, during which no regular mail is delivered, however Priority Mail Express items will still be delivered as that service functions year round.

Though letter carriers have the day off, some postal workers are required to work on holidays, such as clerks dispatching mail, or those working in plant distribution facilities. Some plant facilities operate 365 days a year. Also, RCAs (Rural Carrier Associate) and CCAs (City Carrier Associate) work every Sunday delivering Amazon packages along with delivering Amazon on holidays. 

Part 608, section 3.2 of the DMM (U.S. Domestic Mail Manual) groups holidays into "Widely Observed" and "Not Widely Observed".  Holidays "Widely Observed" include New Year’s Day, Memorial Day, Independence Day, Labor Day,  Thanksgiving Day, and Christmas Day. Holidays "Not Widely Observed" are Martin Luther King Jr.’s Birthday; Presidents Day; Columbus Day; and Veterans Day.

If a holiday occurs on Sunday, the holiday will be observed on Monday.

List of holidays
The ten postal holidays are:

This list is nearly identical to the list of Federal holidays, but does not include inauguration day. If a postal holiday falls on a Sunday, it is observed on the following Monday.

Canada Post also maintains a list of Postal Holidays.

See also

 Federal holidays
 Holidays of the United States
 List of observances in the United States by presidential proclamation

External links
 USPS Domestic Mail Manual, Part 608, Section 3.2, archived as of April 19, 2014

 USPS Postal Schedule for Labor Day 2017

 Postal
United States Postal Service